The ACME Laboratories Ltd is a pharmaceutical company based in Bangladesh. It is part of the ACME Group of Companies. Mizanur Rahman Sinha is the Managing Director and largest shareholder of the company and Nagina Afzal Sinha is the Chairperson.

Corporate history

1954 Year of the establishment (initially as a partnership)
1976 The firm was converted into a private limited company
1983 Commercial operation at the modernized plant equipped with sophisticated and advanced facilities
1995 Company reaches golden jubilee

Factories
ACME's plant is located at Dhulivita in Dhamrai, about 40  km northwest of Dhaka.

References

External links
  Official Site
   Bangladesh Pharmaceutical Society

 Pharmaceutical companies of Bangladesh
 Pharmaceutical companies established in 1954
 Manufacturing companies based in Dhaka
 Bangladeshi brands